Go Soeda was the defending champion, but lost in the quarterfinals.

Chung Hyeon won the title, defeating Lukáš Lacko in the final 6–3, 6–1.

Seeds

Draw

Finals

Top half

Bottom half

References
 Main Draw
 Qualifying Draw

Busan Open - Singles
2015 Singles